The Bhopal – Lucknow Garib Rath Express is a Weekly superfast AC express train service offered by North Eastern Railway Lucknow Division. It ran between Bhopal Junction railway station of Bhopal the capital of Madhya Pradesh and Lucknow Junction railway station, the capital of Uttar Pradesh. The train was announced in the railway budget of 2011-2012.

Route and halts
The train will go via Bina - Jhansi Rail Route. The important halts of the train are :
 Bhopal Junction
 Vidisha
 Bina Junction
 Jhansi Junction
 Kanpur Central
 Lucknow JN

Coach composite

The train consists of 22 Coaches :

 20 AC III Tier
 2 Luggage/Generator Van

Average speed and frequency

The train runs with an average speed of 63 km/h The train runs on a Weekly basis.

Other trains from Bhopal to Lucknow 

12183/12184 Bhopal - Lucknow - Pratapgarh Express (Weekly)

Trivia

 The train goes via. Bina - Jhansi route
 The sixth train announced in between Bhopal and Lucknow point to point.

Rake Sharing

The train shares its rake with Lucknow Raipur Garib Rath Express

Traction 
As the route is yet to be fully electrified, a LDH based WDM-3A locomotive powers the train

See also

Bhopal - Damoh Intercity Express
Indore Junction
Bhopal Junction

References

External links

Transport in Bhopal
Passenger trains originating from Lucknow
Garib Rath Express trains
Railway services introduced in 2011
Rail transport in Madhya Pradesh